Calling Homicide is a 1956 American police drama film directed by Edward Bernds and starring Bill Elliott, Don Haggerty and Kathleen Case. The picture was the third of five films in the Lt. Andy Doyle series, all starring Elliott.

Plot
When a policeman is murdered by a car bomb, Lt. Andy Doyle is given the case to investigate. On the victim he finds the name of a woman, Francine Norman, who is murdered shortly thereafter, strangled and mutilated. Doyle determines that there is a connection between the two deaths. Norman was a former actress who owned a modeling agency that is now run by Darlene Adams.

Doyle finds many suspects, as Norman was universally hated. He uncovers that the agency was being used as a front for a blackmailing racket most likely run by Norman's love interest Jim Haddix, the owner of a local construction company. However, all the evidence of the blackmail ring is destroyed when the modeling school is destroyed by fire, with the janitor as the main suspect.

Cast list
 Bill Elliott as Lt. Andy Doyle
 Don Haggerty as Sgt. Mike Duncan
 Kathleen Case as Donna Graham
 Myron Healey as Jim Haddix
 Jeanne Cooper as Darlene Adams
 Thomas B. Henry as Alan Gilmore
 Lyle Talbot as Tony Fuller
 Almira Sessions as Ida Dunstetter
 Herb Vigran as Ray Engel
 James Best as Arnie Arnholf
 John Dennis as Benny Bendowski
 Robert Bice as Phipps
 John Close as Deputy Warren
 Mel Wells as Valensi
 Dee Carroll as Rita
 Stanley Adams as Peter Van Elda
 Mary Treen as Flo Burton
 Jack Mulhall as Pierson
 William Meigs as Ted Allen
 Harry Strang as Deputy Wall

See also
Dial Red O (1955)
Sudden Danger (1955)
Chain of Evidence (1957)
Footsteps in the Night (1957)
List of American films of 1956

Production
The working title of the film was House on Lookout Mountain. Production began in the first week of April 1956, and was completed before the end of the month. In July, the release date was announced as September 30, 1956. The National Legion of Decency gave the film a Class A Section II rating, indicating that it was morally unobjectionable but for adults only. In December, it was announced that Calling Homicide would be part of a two-film deal, along with Friendly Persuasion, booking first-run films directly into "second-run" theaters. It was the first such deal in the nation.

Reception
Motion Picture Daily gave the film a good review, enjoying its action and pace. It complimented the complexity of the plot, the screenplay and Bernds' direction.

References

External links
 
 
 

1956 films
American drama films
1956 drama films
Allied Artists films
Films directed by Edward Bernds
1950s English-language films
1950s American films
American black-and-white films